The ASUNARO: Action for Youth Rights of Korea, also known as Asunaro is a youth rights organization based in South Korea. The Asunaro was established in 2004 a small forum of the name of Asunaro: Research Forum for Youth Rights, the name was changed to ASUNARO: Action for Youth Rights of Korea in February 2006.

As Asunaro aims to build an equal, democratic society, there are no central departments or representatives. Usually many teams work on a national scale for specific needs, but people in the teams does not represent Asunaro workers and anyone can work in the teams. If needed, a few people will be elected and be in charge for the job.

Every local branches are at the equal terms. Currently, there are 6 local branches, 4 local semi-branches, and several other local communities.

The name Asunaro originated from the imaginary youth organization in the novel Kibō no Kuni no Exodus by Ryū Murakami.

Book 
The Asunaro published a book entitled the Meo-Pi-In about youth rights in 2009.

See also 
 Ordinance of Student Rights
 Solidarity for LGBT Human Rights of Korea
 Yook Woo-dang

References

External links 

 Asunaro website 

Organizations established in 2004
Immigration political advocacy groups in South Korea
LGBT political advocacy groups in South Korea
Liberalism in South Korea
Progressivism in South Korea
Youth rights organizations based in South Korea